In graph theory, an overfull graph is a graph whose size is greater than the product of its maximum degree and half of its order floored, i.e.  where  is the size of G,  is the maximum degree of G, and  is the order of G. The concept of an overfull subgraph, an overfull graph that is a subgraph, immediately follows. An alternate, stricter definition of an overfull subgraph S of a graph G requires .

Properties
A few properties of overfull graphs:
 Overfull graphs are of odd order.
 Overfull graphs are class 2. That is, they require at least  colors in any edge coloring.
 A graph G, with an overfull subgraph S such that , is of class 2.

Overfull conjecture
In 1986, Amanda Chetwynd and Anthony Hilton posited the following conjecture that is now known as the overfull conjecture.

This conjecture, if true, would have numerous implications in graph theory, including the 1-factorization conjecture.

Algorithms
When , there is at most one induced overfull subgraph, and it is possible to find it in linear time.

References

Graph families